Miloslava Misáková (25 February 1922 – 1 July 2015) was a Czech gymnast who competed in the 1948 Summer Olympics, winning gold. She was born in Horákov.

References

1922 births
2015 deaths
People from Brno-Country District
Czech female artistic gymnasts
Olympic gymnasts of Czechoslovakia
Gymnasts at the 1948 Summer Olympics
Olympic gold medalists for Czechoslovakia
Olympic medalists in gymnastics
Medalists at the 1948 Summer Olympics
Sportspeople from the South Moravian Region